Gunthamund (c. 450–496), King of the Vandals and Alans (484-496) was the third king of the north African Vandal Kingdom. He succeeded his unpopular uncle Huneric, and for that reason alone, enjoyed a rather successful reign.

Gunthamund was the second son born to Gento, the fourth and youngest son of Genseric, the founder of the Vandal kingdom in Africa. Because most of Genseric's immediate family was dead, his elder brothers having been murdered by Huneric, When Huneric died on 23 December 484, Gunthamund was the eldest male member of the family. In accordance with Genseric's laws on succession, which decreed that the oldest member of the family would be the successor, he was proclaimed king.

Gunthamund benefited throughout his reign from the fact that the Vandals' most powerful rivals, the Visigoths, Ostrogoths, and the Byzantine Empire, were all heavily involved in wars. Although the Vandals' power had fallen off greatly since its zenith under Genseric, they enjoyed peace under Gunthamund. While he was also an Arian, Gunthamund eased up on Huneric's persecutions of Catholic Christians, which reduced unrest in the kingdom, and stabilized the kingdom's economy, which had been on the verge of collapse.

Unfortunately for the Vandals, Gunthamund died in his mid-forties and thus did not reign for a long time. He was succeeded by his brother Thrasamund, who was not as effective in ruling the kingdom.

References 

450 births
496 deaths
Kings of the Vandals
5th-century monarchs in Africa